This article lists the confirmed national futsal squads for the UEFA Futsal Euro 2012 tournament held in Croatia, between January 30 and February 11, 2012.

Group A

Head coach: Mato Stanković

Head coach: Tomáš Neumann

Head coach: Sito Rivera

Group B

Head coach: José Venancio López Hierro

Head coach: Gennadii Lisenchuk

Head coach: Andrej Dobovičnik

Group C

Head coach: Roberto Menichelli

Head coach: Sergei Skorovich

Head coach: Ömer Kaner

Group D

Head coach: Jorge Braz

Head coach: Aca Kovacevic

Head coach: Alesio Da Silva

External links
UEFA.com

UEFA Futsal Championship squads
Squads